A care trust is a type of NHS trust in the English National Health Service and NHS Wales that provides both health and social care. They may carry out a range of services, including social care, mental health services or primary care services. Care Trusts are set up when the NHS and local authorities agree to work closely together, usually where it is felt that a closer relationship between health and social care is needed or would benefit local care services.

Care trusts were established under the NHS Plan 2000, in England to bring together in one legal entity the commissioning and provision of health and social care services, especially for older people.  Torbay and Southern Devon Health and Care NHS Trust was regarded as the most successful.  Others are Worcestershire Health and Care NHS Trust, Bradford District Care Trust, Kent and Medway NHS and Social Care Partnership Trust and Sheffield Health & Social Care NHS Foundation Trust

Care trusts do not exist in Scotland, nor are there plans to introduce them.

In Northern Ireland, health and social care is organised through five sub-regional health and social care trusts.

References

External links
Care trusts on official NHS website

National Health Service
Social care in England and Wales